Dr. Martin Luther King Jr. Plaza station is a station of the Metrorail rapid transit system in Gladeview, Florida, United States.

The station is located at the intersection of West 27th Avenue (SR 9) and North 62nd Street/Dr. Martin Luther King Jr. Boulevard, opening to service May 19, 1985.

Station layout

Places of interest
Brownsville
Liberty City

References

External links
MDT – Metrorail Stations
 entrance from Google Maps Street View

Green Line (Metrorail)
Metrorail (Miami-Dade County) stations in Miami-Dade County, Florida
Railway stations in the United States opened in 1985
1985 establishments in Florida